John Albert Brittin (March 4, 1924 – January 5, 1994) was an American professional baseball right-handed pitcher. He appeared briefly for the Philadelphia Phillies of Major League Baseball (MLB) in 1950 and 1951.

Born in Athens, Illinois, Brittin served in the United States Navy in the Pacific Theater of World War II, where he was an ensign aboard an Landing Ship, Tank during the Battle of Okinawa. Upon his discharge from the military, he attended the University of Illinois at Urbana–Champaign. His professional playing career extended from 1947 through 1954. In 1949, Brittin won 21 games for the Wilmington Blue Rocks of the Class B Interstate League. He was recalled by the pennant-bound 1950 Phillies in September from Triple-A. In Brittin's big league debut, he pitched a scoreless inning in a marathon, 19-inning victory over the Cincinnati Reds. Cincinnati was ahead, 5–2, when Brittin relieved Robin Roberts in the eighth. Brittin retired the Reds in order, then was removed for a pinch hitter. The Phillies tied the game in the ninth, and then again in the 18th frame, and won it 8–7 in their half of the 19th.

In six total games pitched in MLB, all in relief, Brittin had a 0–0 record with a 6.75 earned run average (ERA). He allowed seven hits, six earned runs, and nine bases on balls, in eight full innings pitched.

On January 5, 1994, Brittin died in Springfield, Illinois, at the age of 69.

References

External links

Jack Brittin at SABR (Baseball BioProject)

1924 births
1994 deaths
Atlanta Crackers players
Baltimore Orioles (IL) players
Baseball players from Illinois
Davenport Cubs players
Illinois Fighting Illini baseball players
Macon Peaches players
Major League Baseball pitchers
Miami Beach Flamingos players
Military personnel from Illinois
People from Menard County, Illinois
Philadelphia Phillies players
Terre Haute Phillies players
Toledo Sox players
Toronto Maple Leafs (International League) players
Wilmington Blue Rocks (1940–1952) players
United States Navy officers
United States Navy personnel of World War II